Charles Matthew Getty (born July 24, 1952) is a former American football offensive lineman who played ten seasons in the National Football League, mainly for the Kansas City Chiefs.

Getty competed in football, track and wrestling at Pompton Lakes High School in his hometown. He played college football and wrestled for Penn State University. He finished fifth in the 1973 NCAA wrestling tournament and third in 1974.

Getty later became an adjunct academic instructor and strength and conditioning coach for Evangel University.

References

1952 births
Living people
People from Pompton Lakes, New Jersey
Players of American football from New Jersey
Pompton Lakes High School alumni
Sportspeople from Passaic County, New Jersey
American football offensive guards
Penn State Nittany Lions football players
Kansas City Chiefs players
Green Bay Packers players